Reece James Flanagan (born 19 October 1994) is an English footballer who plays for Redditch United, where he plays as a midfielder.

Playing career

Walsall
Flanagan scored his first goal for Walsall in an EFL Trophy tie against West Bromwich Albion Under-23s on 19 September 2017.

He was released by Walsall at the end of the 2017–18 season.

On 17 and 18 July 2018, Flanagan played for Grimsby Town on trial in their pre-season game with Sunderland and their Lincolnshire Senior Cup game with Cleethorpes Town.

Non League
On 15 October 2019, Flanagan signed for Rushall Olympic.

It was confirmed on 11 January 2020, that Reece had signed for fellow Southern League Premier Division Central side Stratford Town.

On 16 October 2020, he signed for fellow Southern League Premier Division side Hednesford Town on a free transfer.

On 2 June 2022, he was on the move again to join fellow Southern League Premier Division Central side Redditch United, joining his brother Calum who also joined the club months earlier in January. Redditch manager, Matt Clarke, described it as "a huge signing for the club".

Career statistics

References

External links

1994 births
Living people
Footballers from Birmingham, West Midlands
English footballers
Association football midfielders
Walsall F.C. players
Leamington F.C. players
Rushall Olympic F.C. players
Stratford Town F.C. players
Hednesford Town F.C. players
National League (English football) players
English Football League players
Southern Football League players